Tureh (also Romanized as Tūreh; also known as Tīleh and Tūleh) is a city and capital of Zalian District, in Shazand County, Markazi Province, Iran.  At the 2006 census, its population was 2,167 in 571 families.

References

Populated places in Shazand County

Cities in Markazi Province